John S. Malarkey (May 4, 1872 – October 29, 1949) was a 19th-century right handed pitcher in Major League Baseball who played for the Washington Senators, Chicago Orphans and Boston Beaneaters in a span of six seasons from 1894–1903.

Malarkey entered the records books when he became the only pitcher to date in major league history to earn a victory by hitting his own walk-off home run. On September 10, 1902, Malarkey hit a solo shot against St. Louis Cardinals pitcher Mike O'Neill in the bottom of the 11th inning to give the Beaneaters a 4–3 victory in the second game of a doubleheader at Boston’s South End Grounds.

In that season, Malarkey ranked fourth on the Boston pitching with his eight wins. Besides, he posted a strong 2.59 earned run average and was one of only four ERA qualifiers in the majors who did not surrender a single home run, being the others Ed Siever of the Detroit Tigers and Ed Doheny and Jesse Tannehill, both of the Pittsburgh Pirates.

In between, Malarkey spent all or part of 10 seasons in the minors from 1896–1908, winning 20 or more games in five times.

After his baseball days, Malarkey worked for the Erie Railroad and lived in Marion, Ohio. He later moved to Cincinnati, Ohio, where he died in 1949 of pneumonia at the age of 77.

Sources

External links
 or Retrosheet, or SABR Biography Project 

19th-century baseball players
1872 births
1949 deaths
Baseball players from Ohio
Boston Beaneaters players
Chicago Orphans players
Columbus Senators players
Macon Peaches players
Major League Baseball pitchers
Montgomery Senators players
Newport News-Hampton Deckhands players
Richmond Bluebirds players
Rochester Bronchos players
Rome Romans players
Staunton Hayseeds players
Syracuse Stars (minor league baseball) players
Utica Pent Ups players
Utica Reds players
Washington Senators (1891–1899) players